İstisu is a village and municipality in the Ismailli Rayon of Azerbaijan.  It has a population of 990. The municipality consists of the villages of İstisu and Çayqovuşan.

References 

Populated places in Ismayilli District